The name Sean has been used for two tropical cyclones worldwide, one in the Atlantic Ocean and one in the Australian Region of the Pacific Ocean. In the Atlantic, the name replaced Stan, which was retired after the 2005 season.

In the Atlantic:
Tropical Storm Sean (2011), affected Bermuda

In the Australian region:
Cyclone Sean (2010), affected Western Australia

Atlantic hurricane set index articles
Australian region cyclone set index articles